The 12th edition of the African Amateur Boxing Championships were held in Yaoundé, Cameroon from May 9 to May 18, 2003. The event was organised by the African governing body for amateur boxing, the African Boxing Confederation (ABC).

Medal winners

See also
Boxing at the 2003 All-Africa Games

References
Amateur Boxing

2003
Boxing
African Boxing Championships
2003 African Amateur Boxing Championships
African Amateur Boxing Championships
21st century in Yaoundé
Sport in Yaoundé
Boxing in Cameroon
Events in Yaoundé